The 2002 NCAA Division I men's basketball tournament involved 65 schools playing in single-elimination play to determine the national champion of men's  NCAA Division I college basketball. It began on March 12, 2002, and ended with the championship game on April 1 in Atlanta at the Georgia Dome. A total of 64 games were played.

This was the first year that the tournament used the so-called "pod" system, in which the eight first- and second-round sites are distributed around the four regionals. Teams were assigned to first round spots in order to minimize travel for as many teams as possible. The top seeds at each site were:

Sacramento: Oregon (M2), USC (S4)
Albuquerque: Arizona (W3), Ohio State (W4)
Dallas: Oklahoma (W2), Mississippi State (M3)
St. Louis: Kansas (M1), Kentucky (E4)
Chicago: Georgia (E3), Illinois (M4)
Pittsburgh: Cincinnati (W1), Pittsburgh (S3)
Washington, D.C.: Maryland (E1), Connecticut (E2)
Greenville: Duke (S1), Alabama (S2)

The Final Four consisted of Maryland, making their second consecutive appearance, Kansas, making their first appearance since 1993, Indiana, making their first appearance since 1992, and Oklahoma, making their first appearance since their national runner-up finish in 1988.

Maryland defeated Indiana 64–52 in the championship game to win their first ever national championship. Juan Dixon of Maryland was named the tournament's Most Outstanding Player.

For the second straight tournament, the Elite Eight featured at least one double-digit seed. South Region tenth-seed Kent State and West Region twelfth-seed Missouri played in their respective regional finals, with Kent State losing to Indiana and Missouri losing to Oklahoma. This also marked the first time since 1987 that no team from the states of North Carolina nor Kentucky reached the Final Four.

This tournament was the first since 1974 (the last tournament which only allowed one team per conference) in which the North Carolina Tar Heels were not a participant. The 27-year streak was, at the time, the longest appearance streak in NCAA history, having beat UCLA's 15-year streak in 1990. It has since been topped by Kansas, whose 32-year streak dates back to 1990 and is still active.  (Two other active teams, Michigan State and Gonzaga, also have active 20 year streaks and could beat UNC's streak in 2026 and 2027, respectively.)

Schedule and venues

The following are the sites selected to host each round of the 2002 tournament:

Opening Round
March 12
University of Dayton Arena, Dayton, Ohio (Host: University of Dayton)

First and Second Rounds
March 14 and 16
 ARCO Arena, Sacramento, California (Host: University of the Pacific)
 BI-LO Center, Greenville, South Carolina (Hosts: Southern Conference, Furman University)
 Edward Jones Dome, St. Louis, Missouri (Host: Missouri Valley Conference)
 University Arena, Albuquerque, New Mexico (Host: University of New Mexico)

March 15 and 17
 American Airlines Center, Dallas (Host: Big 12 Conference)
 MCI Center, Washington, D.C. (Host: Georgetown University)
 Mellon Arena, Pittsburgh (Host: Duquesne University)
 United Center, Chicago (Host: Big Ten Conference)

Regional semifinals and finals (Sweet Sixteen and Elite Eight)
March 21 and 23
 South Regional, Rupp Arena, Lexington, Kentucky (Host: University of Kentucky)
 West Regional, Compaq Center at San Jose, San Jose, California (Host: Santa Clara University)
March 22 and 24
 East Regional, Carrier Dome, Syracuse, New York (Host: Syracuse University)
 Midwest Regional, Kohl Center, Madison, Wisconsin (Host: University of Wisconsin–Madison)

National semifinals and championship (Final Four and championship)
March 30 and April 1
Georgia Dome, Atlanta, Georgia (Host: Georgia Institute of Technology)

Qualifying teams

Automatic bids
The following teams were automatic qualifiers for the 2002 NCAA field by virtue of winning their conference's tournament (except for the Ivy League, whose regular-season champion received the automatic bid).

Listed by region and seeding

Bids by conference

Final Four
At Georgia Dome, Atlanta

National semifinals
March 30, 2002
Maryland (E1) 97, Kansas (M1) 88
For the second straight year the Maryland Terrapins earned a bid to the Final Four. This time they would take advantage of their trip. After falling behind 13–2 to the Kansas Jayhawks to begin the game, Maryland stormed to a 44–37 lead at halftime. They expanded their lead to 20, 83–63, with 6:11 left in the game. Roy Williams' Kansas squad did not quit and closed the gap to 4 with under a minute remaining, but the Terps survived to advance to the championship, 97–88. Maryland senior Juan Dixon led the contest in scoring with 33.
Indiana (S5) 73, Oklahoma (W2) 64
Mike Davis's Indiana Hoosiers continued their Cinderella ride in the NCAA tournament by defeating another higher ranked team, the Oklahoma Sooners. Oklahoma led most of the first half, and took a 34–30 lead into halftime. However, with the score 60–60 late in the 2nd half Indiana broke ahead for good with an easy bucket from Jeff Newton, who led the Hoosiers with 19 points. The Hoosiers outscored the Sooners by 13 in the 2nd half and advanced to the championship game with a 73–64 victory. Oklahoma was coached by Kelvin Sampson, who later in his career would succeed Davis as IU head coach.

Championship game

April 1, 2002
Maryland (E1) 64, Indiana (S5) 52
The Maryland Terrapins completed the task they set out to do one year earlier by defeating the Indiana Hoosiers 64–52. Maryland led virtually the entire game except for a brief point with 9:52 left in the basketball game when Indiana took a 44–42 lead. Maryland answered the Hoosier run and ended the game with a 22–8 run to bring home the school's first and coach Gary Williams's only men's basketball National Championship. Senior Juan Dixon was named the tournament's Most Outstanding Player (MOP).

Bracket
* – Denotes overtime period

Opening Round game
Winner advances to 16th seed in East Regional vs. (1) Maryland.

East Regional — Syracuse, New York

Regional Final Summary

Midwest Regional — Madison, Wisconsin

Regional Final Summary

South Regional — Lexington, Kentucky

Regional Final Summary

West Regional — San Jose, California

Regional Final Summary

Final Four — Atlanta, Georgia

Broadcast information
ESPN broadcast the opening-round game, then turned coverage over to CBS Sports for the remaining 63 games.  They were carried on a regional basis until the "Elite Eight", at which point all games were shown nationally.

Westwood One had exclusive radio coverage.

CBS Sports announcers
Jim Nantz/Billy Packer/Bonnie Bernstein – First & Second Round at Washington, D.C.; East Regional at Syracuse, New York; Final Four at Atlanta, Georgia
Dick Enberg/Matt Guokas/Armen Keteyian – First & Second Round at St. Louis, Missouri; South Regional at Lexington, Kentucky
Verne Lundquist/Bill Raftery/Lesley Visser – First & Second Round at Pittsburgh, Pennsylvania; Midwest Regional at Madison, Wisconsin
Gus Johnson/Dan Bonner/Solomon Wilcots – First & Second Round at Albuquerque, New Mexico; West Regional at San Jose, California
Kevin Harlan/Jon Sundvold/Spencer Tillman – First & Second Round at Greenville, South Carolina
Ian Eagle/Jim Spanarkel/Dwayne Ballen – First & Second Round at Sacramento, California
Craig Bolerjack and Bob Wenzel – First & Second Round at Dallas, Texas
Tim Brando/Eddie Fogler/Charles Davis – First & Second Round at Chicago, Illinois

Westwood One announcers
Marty Brennaman and Larry Conley, 1st and 2nd Rounds at Greenville, South Carolina and South Regionals at Lexington, Kentucky

References

NCAA Division I men's basketball tournament
Ncaa
Sports in Madison, Wisconsin
Basketball in the Dallas–Fort Worth metroplex
NCAA Division I men's basketball tournament
NCAA Division I men's basketball tournament
NCAA Division I men's basketball tournament